Ekşi Sözlük ("Sour Dictionary", stylized as ekşi sözlük) is a collaborative hypertext dictionary based on the concept of Web sites built up on user contribution. However, Ekşi Sözlük is not a dictionary in the strict sense; users are not required to write correct information.  It is currently one of the largest online communities in Turkey with over 400,000 registered users. The number of writers is about 110,000. As an online public sphere, Ekşi Sözlük is not only utilized by thousands for information sharing on various topics ranging from scientific subjects to everyday life issues, but also used as a virtual socio-political community to communicate disputed political contents and to share personal views. The site has been blocked in Turkey since February 2023.

History 
The website's founder is Sedat Kapanoğlu. He founded the website for communicating with his friends in 1999 as he was inspired by The Hitchhiker's Guide to the Galaxy. Ekşi Sözlük was a part of a website called sourtimes.org which was named after the Portishead song "Sour Times" and the dictionary was named "Ekşi (Sour)" for this reason.

Ekşi Sözlük has been successful, many other websites that use this concept has emerged, like  in Turkish. Turkish sociologist Zeynep Tüfekçi says it is like "Wikipedia, a social network and Reddit rolled into one".

On February 21, 2023, access to the website was blocked in Turkey by the Information and Communication Technologies Authority of Turkey. On March 2, 2023, the 4th Ankara Peace Court decided to remove the access barrier, but the decision was reversed by a higher court and it remains blocked.

Rules and structure 
Enrollment periods to the dictionary and the criteria of acceptance are changeable. Ekşi Sözlük does not accept new authors continuously; there are specific times in which new authors are accepted. There is a waiting period for new members who want to become authors in which they must post at least 10 entries. All entries are inspected according to the dictionary rules and their quality, and if they pass inspection, the new user becomes an author. However, this process might take from months to years.

Titles are limited to 50 characters in length. Entries have no length limit.

Newcomer, Newcomer awaiting approval, Registered reader, Praetors, and Hacıvat are some of the user roles in Ekşi Sözlük.

Since there are no restrictions on entries, moderators and informers are responsible for catching and deleting any inappropriate entry. Informers are usually the older generation authors who voluntarily report any bad content to moderators for examination. If the moderators find the entries inappropriate, they are deleted.

Site statistics are updated on a daily basis. There are 300 to 400 posts on average for each author. More than half of the authors are at the age of 18–25 and the number of male users is two times more than that of female ones.

No capital letters are allowed in the posts. This prevents all-caps shouting.

Mobile application 
An official application for Ekşi Sözlük has been released in 2017 for iOS and Android platforms.

See also 
 Internet censorship in Turkey

References

External links 

  

1999 establishments in Turkey
Turkish social networking websites
Turkish-language websites
Internet properties established in 1999
Online dictionaries
Collaborative projects